Diarmuid Cody (born 1994) is an Irish hurler who currently plays as a wing back or midfielder for the Kilkenny senior team.

Born in Kilkenny, Cody was introduced to hurling by his father, Brian, the long-serving manager of the Kilkenny senior team. He enjoyed All-Ireland successes at colleges level with St. Kieran's College while simultaneously enjoying championship successes at underage levels with the James Stephens club.

Diarmuid made his debut on the inter-county scene at the age of sixteen when he first linked up with the Kilkenny minor team before later joining the under-21 side. He was added to the senior panel during the 2015 championship.

Honours

Team

St. Kieran's College
All-Ireland Colleges Senior Hurling Championship (1): 2011
Leinster Colleges Senior Hurling Championship (4): 2011,2014,2015,2016

James Stephens 
Kilkenny Minor Hurling Championship (1): 2011
Kilkenny senior championship 2011

References

1994 births
Living people
James Stephens hurlers
Kilkenny inter-county hurlers